Emilian Raychev Kavalski (Bulgarian: Емилиян Райчев Кавалски) is a Bulgarian political scientist and the NAWA Chair Professor at the Complex Systems Lab in the Jagiellonian University in Krakow, Poland. He is the book series editor for Routledge’s Rethinking Asia and International Relations series, and an Editor of the journal Asian Studies Review. Prior to joining the Jagiellonian University in September 2021, he was the Li Dak-Sum Chair Professor in China-Eurasia Relations and International Studies at the University of Nottingham Ningbo China (2018-2021). In 2006, he completed his PhD in International Relations at the Loughborough University. Kavalski was a Senior Lecturer in Politics and International Relations at the Western Sydney University (2008-2013), and then a Research Associate Professor of Global Studies at the Australian Catholic University (2014-2018).

Works

Monographs
The Guanxi of Relational International Theory (2021)
Central Asia and the Rise of Normative Powers: Contextualizing the Security Governance of the European Union, China, and India (2012)
India and Central Asia: The Mythmaking and International Relations of a Rising Power (2009)

Single-edited books
 The Ashgate Research Companion to Chinese Foreign Policy (2016)
 Stable Outside, Fragile Inside?: Post-Soviet Statehood in Central Asia (2016)
 China and the Global Politics of Regionalization (2016)
 World Politics at the Edge of Chaos: Reflections on Complexity and Global Life (2015)
 Encounters with World Affairs: An Introduction to International Relations (2015)
The New Central Asia: The Regional Impact of International Actors (2010)

Co-edited books
China’s Rise and Rethinking International Relations Theory (2022) with Chengxin Pan
Posthuman Dialogues in International Relations (2021)
Defunct Federalisms: Critical Perspectives on Federal Failure (2016)
Power Transition in Asia (2016)
Asian Thought on China's Changing International Relations (2014)

External links

References 

Academic staff of Jagiellonian University
Bulgarian political scientists
Year of birth missing (living people)
Living people